Dr. Thomas Sprigg Wootton (c. 1740 – 1789) an American politician who served as one of members of the Maryland Constitutional Convention. Wootton was also one of the founders of Montgomery County, Maryland, which he did by introducing a bill in the Maryland General Assembly on September 6, 1776, to divide Frederick into three counties---Frederick, Montgomery, and Washington.  These were the first counties in America to be established by elected representatives. The names selected for the new counties also broke with tradition.  Earlier counties had all been named for old-world figures such as Prince George and Queen Anne, but these were named after two popular Americans of the time—George Washington and Richard Montgomery. Wootton was a slave owner, inheriting them from his father. Wootton also participated in the selling of enslaved people to the South.

The Thomas S. Wootton High School in Rockville, Maryland is named after him.

References

1740s births
1789 deaths
American slave owners
People from Montgomery County, Maryland
People of colonial Maryland